Flupyradifurone is an organic heterocyclic compound. It is used as a novel butenolide insecticide. Flupyradifurone shows efficient protection to crops and is much safer for non-target organisms compared to other commercial insecticides. Flupyradifurone was developed by Bayer CropScience under the name Sivanto. Sivanto was launched in 2014 since it obtained its first commercial registration in central America (Guatemala and Honduras). Insecticide Resistance Action Committee (IRAC) classified Flupyradifurone as 4D subset (butenolide) and it is the first pesticide in the butenolide category. In 2015, it was approved by EU.

Characteristics 

Flupyradifurone is an agonist of insect nicotinic acetylcholine receptors (nAChRs). Some research pointed out some of the sucking pests have built resistances to nearly all kinds of chemical pesticides. However, Flupyradifurone shows good effectiveness on aphids and whitefly controlling and help to maintain yields of crops such as vegetables, fruits, cotton, and coffee. It also demonstrated positive toxicological and ecotoxicological safety.

According to the research, flupyradifurone has a high rate of uptake by plants and crops. The authors used phosphor imaging analysis to monitor the uptake and translocation of [pyridinylmethyl-14C]-labeled flupyradifurone by tomato plants. The result revealed fast root uptake and the even distribution of labeled flupyradifurone in the entire plant. Flupyradifurone is delivered via xylem translocation in the plants. The concentration in the plants reached the highest point in 7 and 14 days. After 24 days of the application, a significant decline is observed. Flupyradifurone also featured excellent speed of action. The speed of action can be observed by the prohibition of honeydew excretion. After applying the flupyradifurone to the plant by spraying, the honeydew excretion is inhibited within 2 hours and all the aphids die after 48 hours. The result demonstrated that flupyradifurone has an exceptional speed of action compared to other commercial pesticide.

Flupyradifurone presented potent efficacy in controlling aphids and whiteflies. According to bioassays research, the flupyradifurone has lower LC50 numbers of aphid and whitefly compared to imidacloprid. In the field trial, flupyradifurone controlled the lettuce aphid at a favorable rate via foliar applying. It had the highest efficiency (96%) of controlling lettuce aphid after 6–10 days of the application.

Mode of action 
Insect nicotinic acetylcholine receptors will interact with flupyradifurone. When flupyradifurone binds to the protein receptor of insects, this will cause depolarizing ion current to nerve cells. Insect cannot detoxify of flupyradifurone according to the research of CYP6CM1-mediated metabolism. Since flupyradifurone cannot be inactivated by acetylcholinesterase, It will lead to the failure of nerve system of insects and end up with the death of insects.

Synthesis 
The synthesis of flupyradifurone was inspired by a natural insecticide, stemofoline. Stemofoline has some advantageous features, such as being fast-acting and an effective antifeedant, however, it does not demonstrate high efficiency on binding insect nAChRs.

There are two ways to synthesis flupyradifurone. First, flupyradifurone can be synthesized from reacting tetronic acid with 2,2-difluoroethylamine, and then the intimidate, 4-[(2-fluoroethyl)amino]furane-2(5H)-one, will be obtained. Heat the reaction intermediate with 2-chloro-5-(chloromethyl)pyridine in THF under reflux and the final product will be acquired after purification.

The second method is that tetronic acid reacted with a secondary amine under toluene and reflux. Heat tetronic acid, 4-touluenesulfonic acid, and N-[(6-chloropyridin-3-yl)methyl]-2,2-difluoroethane-1-amine in toluene under reflux for 2 hours and the final product will be acquired after purification.

Toxicological and ecotoxicological safety 
Using the U.S. Environmental Protection Agency guidelines to classify carcinogenic effects, flupyradifurone is categorized as "not likely to be carcinogenic to humans." It is not irritant to humans' eyes and skin, and the EPA does not find there to be a concern about occupational exposure.

For the non-target species, flupyradifurone also presents toxicological safety at low concentration. Flupyradifurone will still bind to the nicotinic acetylcholine receptors of honey bees, however, it will only affect the taste and appetitive learning performance at the highest labeled concentration. The LD50 of honey bee acute contact is >100 μg/bee and acute oral is 1200 ng/bee. For bumblebee, the acute contact LD50 is >100 μg/bee.

References 

Pyridines
Furanones
Chloropyridines
Difluoromethyl compounds
Tertiary amines